Jan Niklas Wimberg (born 11 February 1996) is a German professional basketball player for Bayern Munich of the Basketball Bundesliga (BBL) and the EuroLeague. He also represents the Germany national team.

Personal life
He studied Economics in the IU International University of Applied Sciences.

National team career
He is part of the German team in the Men's tournament at the 2020 Summer Olympics in Tokyo.

References

External links
 Jan Wimberg at RealGM

1996 births
Living people
Basketball players at the 2020 Summer Olympics
Eisbären Bremerhaven players
EWE Baskets Oldenburg players
FC Bayern Munich basketball players
Forwards (basketball)
German men's basketball players
NINERS Chemnitz players
Olympic basketball players of Germany
Rockets (basketball club) players
Sportspeople from Oldenburg